Turaga Sundara Rama Prasada Rao (1939−2022) was an Indian engineer, known for his contributions in the fields of petroleum refining and heterogeneous catalysis. He was a former director of the Indian Institute of Petroleum and a former deputy general manager of the Indian Petrochemicals Corporation Limited. He is known to have done studies in petrochemical engineering; his studies have been documented by way of a number of articles and Google Scholar, an online repository of scientific articles has listed 123 of them. He has also co-edited a book, Recent Advances in Basic and Applied Aspects of Industrial Catalysis, published by Elsevier.

Born on January 20, 1939, Rao was an elected fellow of Indian National Academy of Engineering, and the Indian Academy of Sciences. He was also a member of Andhra Pradesh Akademi of Sciences, Indian Institute of Chemical Engineers, and New York Academy of Sciences. He shared the 1996 Om Prakash Bhasin Award for Engineering with M. R. Srinivasan and C. G. Krishnadas Nair. He received the Petrotech Lifetime Achievement Award in 2004. He was also a recipient of several other honors including Chemtech Outstanding Scientist Award, K. G. Naik Gold Medal, FICCI Award Technology Award of the Council of Scientific and Industrial Research.

Rao passed away on April 7, 2022, at the age of 83.

Selected bibliography

Books

Articles

Notes

References

External links 
 
 
 

Indian engineers
Indian scientific authors
Living people
1939 births
Petroleum engineers
Fellows of the Indian Academy of Sciences
Fellows of the Indian National Academy of Engineering
People from Machilipatnam